Microtubule-associated protein 1A is a protein that in humans is encoded by the MAP1A gene.

Function 

This gene encodes a protein that belongs to the microtubule-associated protein family. The proteins of this family are thought to be involved in microtubule assembly, which is an essential step in neurogenesis. The product of this gene is a precursor polypeptide that presumably undergoes proteolytic processing to generate the final MAP1A heavy chain and LC2 light chain. Expression of this gene is almost exclusively in the brain. Studies of the rat microtubule-associated protein 1A gene suggested a role in early events of spinal cord development.

Interactions 

MAP1A has been shown to interact with DISC1.

References

Further reading